Magra Islet is off the coast of Queensland, Australia 15 km northeast of Cape Grenville in the Great Barrier Reef Marine Park. Situated on the north end of Cockburn reef, 2 1/2 km from Bootie Island; it is little more than a sandy shoal with little vegetation.

The islet is a member of the Cockburn Islands in the Wuthathi Tumra Region of the GBR Marine Park.  It is in the Saunders Islands National Park.

Magra Islet was named after James Mario Matra, a midshipman on HMS Endeavour, by Captain James Cook.  Marta is believed to be the first American to visit the future Australia.

References

Islands on the Great Barrier Reef
Uninhabited islands of Australia
Islands of Far North Queensland
Great Barrier Reef Marine Park